Adam Johnson (born June 22, 1994) is an American professional ice hockey forward who is currently playing with Augsburger Panther in the Deutsche Eishockey Liga (DEL). He previously played with the Pittsburgh Penguins of the National Hockey League (NHL).

Playing career
Johnson played junior hockey out of high school in the United States Hockey League (USHL) with the Indiana Ice and Sioux City Musketeers. Undrafted, he played two seasons of collegiate hockey with the University of Minnesota Duluth in the National Collegiate Hockey Conference (NCHC).

Following his sophomore season with the Bulldogs in 2016–17, where he scored 18 goals and tallied 37 points in 42 games, finishing second on the club in both goals and points. Johnson clinched Minnesota-Duluth's berth in the 2017 Frozen Four when he scored an overtime, power-play goal to defeat Boston University, 3–2. Johnson and the Bulldogs eventually fell to the University of Denver, 3–2, in the NCAA championship game.

Johnson attended the Pittsburgh Penguins prospect development camp before opting to conclude his collegiate career early, agreeing to a two-year, entry-level contract with the Penguins on July 6, 2017.

As a free agent from the Penguins following three-seasons within the organization, Johnson due to the COVID-19 pandemic delaying the North American season, opted to sign a contract abroad for the 2020–21 season with Swedish club, Malmö Redhawks of the Swedish Hockey League (SHL), on December 15, 2020. Appearing with the Redhawks in a top-six forward role, Johnson added 7 goals and 12 points through 21 regular season games before opting to break his contract and return to North America on March 27, 2020.

On April 6, 2021, Johnson signed as a free agent for the remainder of the 2020–21 season with the Ontario Reign of the AHL, the primary affiliate to the Los Angeles Kings. Adding an offensive presence, Johnson posted 11 points in just 14 games.

Remaining with the Reign into the following 2021–22 season, Johnson registered 1 goal and 6 points through 28 regular season games before he was traded to the Lehigh Valley Phantoms in exchange for future considerations on February 17, 2022.

As a free agent in the following off-season, Johnson opted to resume his European career, signing a one-year deal with German club, Augsburger Panther of the DEL, on September 12, 2022.

Career statistics

Awards and honors

References

External links

1994 births
Living people
American men's ice hockey centers
Augsburger Panther players
Hibbing High School alumni
Indiana Ice players
Lehigh Valley Phantoms players
Malmö Redhawks players
Minnesota Duluth Bulldogs men's ice hockey players
Ontario Reign (AHL) players
Pittsburgh Penguins players
Sioux City Musketeers players
Undrafted National Hockey League players
Wilkes-Barre/Scranton Penguins players